Charles L. Cooke (September 3, 1891 – December 25, 1958), known as Doc Cook, was an American jazz bandleader and arranger. Cook was a Doctor of Music, awarded by the Chicago Musical College in 1926.

Born in Louisville, he first worked as a composer and arranger in Detroit before moving to Chicago around 1910. Cook became resident leader of the orchestra at Paddy Harmon's Dreamland Ballroom in Chicago from 1922 to 1927, acting as conductor and musical director.

The ensemble recorded under several names, such as Cookie's Gingersnaps, Doc Cook and his 14 Doctors of Syncopation, and Doc Cook's Dreamland Orchestra. Among those who played in Cook's band were Freddie Keppard, Jimmie Noone, Johnny St. Cyr, Zutty Singleton, Andrew Hilaire, and Luis Russell. After 1927 Cook's orchestra played in Chicago at the Municipal Pier and the White City Ballroom.

In 1930, Cook moved to New York City and worked as an arranger for Radio City Music Hall and RKO, working there into the 1940s. On Broadway, he had a number of important orchestration credits, including The Hot Mikado (1939) and the first U.S. production of The Boy Friend in collaboration with Ted Royal in 1954. A proponent of ragtime, he also worked frequently with Eubie Blake, supplying the arrangements for the 1952 revival of Shuffle Along.

Recordings
Cook recorded six sides for Gennett in early 1924, then as Cookie's Gingersnaps, recorded 4 sides for OKeh in June 1926. He then signed to Columbia where he recorded 14 sides between July 1926 through March 1928.

References

Sources

External links
 
 Charles L. Cooke at Internet Broadway Database
 
 Doc Cooke (1891-1958 Red Hot Jazz Archive

1891 births
1958 deaths
American jazz bandleaders
American music arrangers
Musicians from Chicago
Musicians from Louisville, Kentucky
20th-century American conductors (music)
Jazz musicians from Kentucky
Jazz musicians from Illinois